This article lists the heads of state of Libya since the country's independence in 1951.

Libya is in a tumultuous state since the start of the Arab Spring-related Libyan Crisis in 2011; the crisis resulted in the collapse of the Libyan Arab Jamahiriya and the killing of Muammar Gaddafi, amidst the First Civil War and the foreign military intervention. The crisis was deepened by the factional violence in the aftermath of the First Civil War, resulting in the outbreak of the Second Civil War in 2014. The control over the country is currently split between the House of Representatives (HoR) in Tobruk and the Government of National Unity (GNU) in Tripoli and their respective supporters, as well as various jihadist groups and tribal elements controlling parts of the country.

Heads of state of Libya (1951–present)

Timeline

Incoming election

See also

 List of governors-general of Italian Libya
 List of heads of government of Libya
 Brotherly Leader and Guide of the Revolution

References

External links
 World StatesmenLibya

Libya
List
Heads of state
Heads of state